Arofylline (codenamed LAS 31025) is a phosphodiesterase inhibitor.

References

Chlorobenzenes
Phosphodiesterase inhibitors
Xanthines
Propyl compounds